Acorán Barrera Reyes (born 31 January 1983), known simply as Acorán, is a Spanish professional footballer who plays as an attacking midfielder.

He appeared in 176 Segunda División matches over five seasons, scoring 28 goals for Ponferradina. He also spent several years in the Cypriot First Division, with AEK Larnaca.

Club career
Born in Santa Cruz de Tenerife, Canary Islands, Acorán made his professional debut with hometown's CD Tenerife, first appearing in La Liga on 9 September 2001 in a 3–0 away loss against RC Celta de Vigo (eight minutes played). After the team's relegation, he resumed his career in the third and fourth divisions, three of those seasons still as a Tenerife player.

In the last days of the 2011 January transfer window, Acorán signed for SD Ponferradina of the second tier, from CD Puertollano. He started in 19 of his 20 appearances during the campaign, but could not help prevent the Castile and León club's relegation.

On 20 December 2011, Acorán scored against Real Madrid in the Copa del Rey, albeit in a 5–1 defeat at the Santiago Bernabéu Stadium (7–1 on aggregate). After winning promotion to division two in 2012, he never played less than 36 league games in the following four seasons, always in that tier.

Acorán moved abroad for the first time at the age of 33, signing with Cypriot First Division club AEK Larnaca FC. On 16 May 2018, he scored the winning goal in the domestic cup final, sealing a 2–1 victory over Apollon Limassol FC and enabling them to collect their first silverware since lifting the same trophy in 2004.

Honours
AEK Larnaca
Cypriot Cup: 2017–18
Cypriot Super Cup: 2018

References

External links

1983 births
Living people
Spanish footballers
Footballers from Santa Cruz de Tenerife
Association football midfielders
La Liga players
Segunda División players
Segunda División B players
CD Tenerife B players
CD Tenerife players
Burgos CF footballers
Universidad de Las Palmas CF footballers
Celta de Vigo B players
UD Melilla footballers
CD Puertollano footballers
SD Ponferradina players
Cypriot First Division players
AEK Larnaca FC players
Spanish expatriate footballers
Expatriate footballers in Cyprus
Spanish expatriate sportspeople in Cyprus